Jean Edward Smith (October 13, 1932 – September 1, 2019) was a biographer and the John Marshall Professor of Political Science at Marshall University.  He was also professor emeritus at the University of Toronto after having served as professor of political economy  there for thirty-five years. Smith was also on the faculty of the Master of American History and Government program at Ashland University.

The winner of the 2008 Francis Parkman Prize and the 2002 finalist for the Pulitzer Prize for Biography or Autobiography, Smith was called "today’s foremost biographer of formidable figures in American history."

Education and military service

A graduate of McKinley High School in Washington, D.C., Smith received an A.B. from Princeton University in 1954. While attending Princeton, Smith was mentored under law professor and political scientist William M. Beaney. Serving in the military from 1954 to 1961, he rose to the rank of Captain (RA) US Army (Artillery). Smith served in West Berlin and Dachau, Germany. In 1964, he obtained a Ph.D. from the Department of Public Law and Government of Columbia University.

Career
Smith began his teaching career as assistant professor of government at Dartmouth College, a post he held from 1963 until 1965. He then became a professor of political economy at the University of Toronto in 1965 until his retirement in 1999. Smith also served as visiting professor at several universities during his tenure at the University of Toronto and after his retirement including the Freie Universität in Berlin, Georgetown University, the University of Virginia’s Woodrow Wilson Department of Government and Foreign Affairs, the University of California at San Diego, and Marshall University in Huntington, West Virginia. He died on September 1, 2019, from complications of Parkinson's disease with his family by his side.

Bibliography
Smith won the 2008 Francis Parkman Prize for FDR, his 2007 biography.  He was the 2002 finalist for the Pulitzer Prize for Biography or Autobiography for Grant, his 2001 biography.

 The Defense of Berlin. Baltimore: Johns Hopkins University Press, 1963.
 The Wall as Watershed. Arlington, Virginia: Institute for Defense Analyses, 1966.
 Germany Beyond the Wall: People, Politics, and Prosperity. Boston: Little, Brown, 1969.
 The Papers of Lucius D. Clay: Germany, 1945-1949. (ed.) Bloomington, Ind.: Indiana University Press, 1974.
 The Evolution of NATO with Four Plausible Threat Scenarios. (with Steven L. Canby), Ottawa, Canada: Canada Department of National Defence, 1987.
 The Conduct of American Foreign Policy Debated. (with Herbert Levine) New York: McGraw-Hill, 1990.
 Civil Rights and Civil Liberties Debated. (with Herbert Levine) 1988.
 The Constitution and American Foreign Policy.
 Lucius D. Clay: An American Life. New York: Henry Holt and Company, 1990.
 George Bush's War. New York: Henry Holt and Company, 1992.
 John Marshall: Definer of a Nation. New York: Henry, Holt & Company, 1996.
 The Face of Justice: Portraits of John Marshall. (with William H. Gerdts, Wendell D. Garrett, Frederick S. Voss, and David B. Dearinger), Huntington, West Virginia: Huntington Museum of Art, 2001.
 Grant. New York: Simon and Schuster, 2001.
 FDR. New York: Random House, 2007.
 Eisenhower in War and Peace. New York: Random House, 2012.
 Bush. New York: Simon & Schuster, 2016.
 The Liberation of Paris: How Eisenhower, de Gaulle, and von Choltitz Saved the City of Light. New York: Simon and Schuster, 2019.

References

External links

1932 births
2019 deaths
21st-century American historians
21st-century American male writers
Ashland University faculty
Columbia University alumni
Dartmouth College faculty
Georgetown University faculty
Legal historians
Marshall University faculty
Military personnel from Washington, D.C.
Official biographers to the presidents of the United States
Princeton University alumni
United States Army officers
University of California, San Diego faculty
Academic staff of the University of Toronto
University of Virginia faculty
Writers from Washington, D.C.
American male non-fiction writers